Arithmetic Fuchsian groups are a special class of Fuchsian groups constructed using orders in quaternion algebras. They are particular instances of arithmetic groups. The prototypical example of an arithmetic Fuchsian group is the modular group . They, and the hyperbolic surface associated to their action on the hyperbolic plane often exhibit particularly regular behaviour among Fuchsian groups and hyperbolic surfaces.

Definition and examples

Quaternion algebras 

A quaternion algebra over a field  is a four-dimensional central simple -algebra.

A quaternion algebra is said to be split over  if it is isomorphic as an -algebra to the algebra of matrices .

Arithmetic Fuchsian groups 

Let  be a totally real number field and  a quaternion algebra over  satisfying the following conditions. We also ask that for all other embeddings  the algebra  is not split (this is equivalent to its being isomorphic to the Hamilton quaternions).

The discreteness is a rather immediate consequence of the fact that  is only split at one real embedding. The finiteness of covolume is harder to prove.

It follows immediately from this definition that arithmetic Fuchsian groups are discrete and of finite covolume (this means that they are lattices in ).

Examples 

Of course the arithmeticity of such subgroups follows from the fact that they are finite-index in the arithmetic group  ; they belong to a more general class of finite-index subgroups, congruence subgroups.

There is a plentiful supply of such algebras.

More generally, all orders in quaternion algebras (satisfying the above conditions) which are not  yield cocompact subgroups. A further example of particular interest is obtained by taking  to be the Hurwitz quaternions.

Maximal subgroups 

A natural question is to identify those among arithmetic Fuchsian groups which are not strictly contained in a larger discrete subgroup. These are called maximal Kleinian groups and it is possible to give a complete classification in a given arithmetic commensurability class.

Congruence subgroups 

The notion of a congruence subgroup generalizes to cocompact arithmetic Fuchsian groups and the results above also hold in this general setting.

Construction via quadratic forms 

Arithmetic Fuchsian groups can be constructed directly in the latter group by taking the integral points in the orthogonal group associated to quadratic forms defined over number fields (and satisfying certain conditions).

In this correspondence the modular group is associated up to commensurability to the group

Arithmetic Kleinian groups 

The subgroups of  commensurable to those obtained by this construction are called arithmetic Kleinian groups. As in the Fuchsian case arithmetic Kleinian groups are discrete subgroups of finite covolume.

Trace fields of arithmetic Fuchsian groups 

The invariant trace field of a Fuchsian group (or, through the monodromy image of the fundamental group, of a hyperbolic surface) is the field generated by the traces of the squares of its elements. In the case of an arithmetic surface whose fundamental group is commensurable with a Fuchsian group derived from a quaternion algebra over a number field  the invariant trace field equals .

One can in fact characterise arithmetic manifolds through the traces of the elements of their fundamental group, a result known as Takeuchi's criterion. A Fuchsian group is an arithmetic group if and only if the following three conditions are realised:
Its invariant trace field  is a totally real number field; 
The traces of its elements are algebraic integers; 
There is an embedding  such that for any  in the group,  and for any other embedding  we have .

Geometry of arithmetic hyperbolic surfaces 

The Lie group  is the group of positive isometries of the hyperbolic plane . If moreover  is torsion-free then the action is free and the quotient space  is a surface (a 2-manifold) with a hyperbolic metric (a Riemannian metric of constant sectional curvature −1). If  is an arithmetic Fuchsian group such a surface  is called an arithmetic hyperbolic surface (not to be confused with the arithmetic surfaces from arithmetic geometry; however when the context is clear the "hyperbolic" specifier may be omitted).

Volume formula and finiteness 

It is possible to give a formula for the volume of distinguished arithmetic surfaces from the arithmetic data with which it was constructed. Let  be a maximal order in the quaternion algebra  of discriminant  over the field , let  be its degree,  its discriminant and  its Dedekind zeta function. Its volume is computed by the formula

 

The reader can check that if  the output of this formula recovers the well-known result that the hyperbolic volume of the modular surface equals .

Coupled with the description of maximal subgroups and finiteness results for number fields this formula allows to prove the following statement:

Note that in dimensions four and more Wang's finiteness theorem (a consequence of local rigidity) asserts that this statement remains true by replacing "arithmetic" by "finite volume". An asymptotic equivalent for the number if arithmetic manifolds of a certain volume was given by Belolipetsky—Gelander—Lubotzky—Mozes.

Minimal volume 

The hyperbolic orbifold of minimal volume can be obtained as the surface associated to a particular order, the Hurwitz quaternion order, and it is compact of volume .

Closed geodesics and injectivity radii 

A closed geodesic on a Riemannian manifold is a closed curve that is also geodesic. One can give an effective description of the set of such curves in an arithmetic surface or three—manifold: they correspond to certain units in certain quadratic extensions of the base field (the description is lengthy and shall not be given in full here). For example, the length of primitive closed geodesics in the modular surface corresponds to the absolute value of units of norm one in real quadratic fields. This description was used by Sarnak to establish a conjecture of Gauss on the mean order of class groups of real quadratic fields.

Arithmetic surfaces can be used to construct families of surfaces of genus  for any  which satisfy the (optimal, up to a constant) systolic inequality

Spectra of arithmetic hyperbolic surfaces

Laplace eigenvalues and eigenfunctions 

The associated eigenvalues  are unbounded and their asymptotic behaviour is ruled by Weyl's law.

In the case where  is arithmetic these eigenfunctions are a special type of automorphic forms for  called Maass forms.

The case where  is of finte volume is more complicated but a similar theory can be established via the notion of cusp form.

Selberg conjecture 

The spectral gap of the surface  is by definition the gap between the smallest eigenvalue  and the second smallest eigenvalue ; thus its value equals  and we shall denote it by  In general it can be made arbitrarily small (ref Randol) (however it has a positive lower bound for a surface with fixed volume). The Selberg conjecture is the following statement providing a conjectural uniform lower bound in the arithmetic case:

Note that the statement is only valid for a subclass of arithmetic surfaces and can be seen to be false for general subgroups of finite index in lattices derived from quaternion algebras. Selberg's original statement was made only for congruence covers of the modular surface and it has been verified for some small groups. Selberg himself has proven the lower bound  a result known as "Selberg's 1/16 theorem". The best known result in full generality is due to Luo—Rudnick—Sarnak.

The uniformity of the spectral gap has implications for the construction of expander graphs as Schreier graphs of

Relations with geometry 

However the precise relation is not explicit.

Another relation between spectrum and geometry is given by Cheeger's inequality, which in the case of a surface  states roughly that a positive lower bound on the spectral gap of  translates into a positive lower bound for the total length of a collection of smooth closed curves separating  into two connected components.

Quantum ergodicity 

The unique quantum ergodicity conjecture of Rudnick and Sarnak asks whether the stronger statement that individual eigenfunctions equidistribure is true. Formally, the statement is as follows.

Let   be an arithmetic surface and  be a sequence of functions on  such that 

Then for any smooth, compactly supported function  on  we have

In the case of congruence covers of the modular some additional difficulties occur, which were dealt with by K. Soundararajan.

Isospectral surfaces 

The fact that for arithmetic surfaces the arithmetic data determines the spectrum of the Laplace operator  was pointed out by M. F. Vignéras and used by her to construct examples of isospectral compact hyperbolic surfaces. The precise statement is as follows:

The resulting isospectral hyperbolic surfaces are then not isometric.

Notes

References 

Hyperbolic geometry
Discrete groups
Differential geometry
Number theory